Bury Lake Young Mariners is an RYA certified sailing school and training centre for people of ages 7+ that has been in operation since 1983 at Bury Lake in Rickmansworth Aquadrome, Hertfordshire, England.  The charity has more than 100 boats and each year enables around 7,500 mostly young people to go sailing. 

BLYM is unique in that it has no paid staff. It is run entirely by over 300 volunteers.

Award-winning youth charity

2013
In 2013, Bury Lake Young Mariners won the prestigious Queen's Award for Voluntary Service.  The award is equivalent to the MBE and is the highest award that can be made to a voluntary group.
The award was made for "assisting with youth development through accessible and
affordable sailing and sail training activities".

2015
The charity was one of five finalists for Club of the Year, awarded by the Royal Yachting Association.

New Building Development

General information
The Original Clubhouse is now being replaced by three new buildings. The Boathouse, the 'Wetzone' and the New Clubhouse. The ongoing development started in 2017/8 and as of November 2022, The Boathouse and the Wetzone have been completed whilst the New Clubhouse is yet to be started.

Boathouse
The new boathouse has replaced the old 'green crate', which was a shipping container that held the club's sailing equipment. This new development has allowed for fleet expansion. The new boathouse also stores BLYM's 9 safety boats.

Wetzone
This building currently sits next to the clubhouse, on the opposite side of the site to the boathouse - running alongside Bury Lake. It holds all age changing rooms, bathrooms and a 'Wetstore', holding all of the BLYM owned sailing clothing - Buoyancy aids, Wetsuits e.t.c.

The Future
Bury Lake Young Mariners will soon build the final building in the project, which will be the new clubhouse. It will sit facing the 'Wetzone' and consist of classrooms, a galley and more. This will mean that the old club house will be demolished to make room for more boats to be housed and a larger rigging area.

Fleet

Sail boats
Currently, the club consists of;
9 Oppies
9 "Funboats"
12 Toppers
9 Picos
20 RS Zests - The eventual successor of the Picos.
2 Vagos
2 RS200s
6 RS Quests - which were the Bahia's replacements
6 Wayfarer Mk IVs
12 Lasers
9 Coypus, which are the only remaining boats that were part of the original fleet and one of only two clubs in the UK that still sail them today.

Powered Craft
BLYM has a designated fleet of 9 Safety Boats. These are primarily for the safety of sailors and are used to assist and coach people on the water. 
The fleet consists of;
1 Dell Quay Dory 13 with a Yamaha F25 engine,
1 Jenneau Rigiflex 370 with a Yamaha F20 engine,
1 Jenneau Rigiflex 370 with a Yamaha F8 engine (WATCH II),
2 Highfield 380 RIBs with Yamaha F9.9 engines,
2 XS 360 RIBs with Yamaha F9.9 engines,
2 Avon Rover 340s with Yamaha F9.9 engines
1 Tod Launch with a Yanmar Diesel Inboard engine. This is the only powerboat that remains of the original fleet.

Instructor Team

Chairman
The current chairman is David Rideout. 
The first chairman of the club was Dr. Ken Smith, a chemistry teacher at Rickmansworth School

Chief Instructor/Club Principal
Club Principal - Ben Constable (RYA Senior Instructor). 
Chief Instructor - Edward Bourton (RYA Senior Instructor). 

They replaced Robert Arthur in the summer of 2022, who was previous joint Chief Instructor/Principal.

Youth Team
BLYM has an active youth team consisting of a few young instructors to discuss issues of the younger generations and to also ensure that young members of the club and instructors are represented properly.

References

Yacht clubs in England
Rickmansworth
Sailing